= Mararikkulam North =

- village
- Location in Kerala, India Mararikkulam North (India)
- Coordinates: 9.607943°N 76.314419°E
- Country: India
- State: Kerala
- District: Alappuzha

Population (2011)
  - Total: 31,322

Languages
  - Official: Malayalam, English
- Time zone: UTC+5:30 (IST)

Mararikkulam North is a village in Alappuzha district in the Indian state of Kerala.

== Demographics ==
As of 2011 India census, Mararikkulam North had a population of 31322 with 15257 males and 16065 females.
